Junkyard Empire is an American political music and action group based out of Saint Paul, Minnesota. The group has been actively calling for the awakening and collective rebellion against the tyranny of oligopolistic corporate capitalism - of which they claim America is the world's hegemonic purveyor. Their style is unique, in that it conforms to already nailed-down categorical standard, with wild mix of hip-hop, rock, jazz and dark electronics, underlying the deep political revolution-focused lyrics of rapper Brihanu.

The band accomplished a large amount of recorded material and live performances with little recognition from the mainstream press in the Twin Cities. That changed when they played a show at the No Peace for the War Makers rally on a huge stage at the Minnesota State Capital during the 2008 Republican National Convention protests. Their performance was a turning point for the band and the movement that ultimately lead to them supporting and performing for nationally coordinated occupation protests of New York City and Washington D.C. leading up to the global Occupy Movement.

Early history
Junkyard Empire was formed in Fall 2006 as an acid jazz/hip-hop collaboration between friends Brian Lozenski (a.k.a. Brihanu) and Christopher Cox and has evolved through stylistic and instrumental experimentation throughout the years thereafter. During this time the band morphed from a jazz sextet with two horns - with Jamie Delzer on saxophone - in their first studio album, Reclaim Freedom (2007), to a rock/jazz quintet in Rise of the Wretched (2008) - always with Lozenski rapping over the top.

The band evolved more deeply into the rock-jazz sound with the addition of Dan Choma on Bass and Christopher Cox beginning to incorporate and experiment with electronics and keyboard in addition to his trombone. The "electric trombone" has since become a very significant element of Junkyard Empire's subsequent recordings and compositional direction, leading to a much more integrated soundscape.

As a highly politically active group, Junkyard Empire geared up for the 2008 election by campaigning, canvassing and participating in many direct actions in protest of the 2008 Republican National Convention (RNC) in Saint Paul, Minnesota by performing an "Anti-RNC Tour," coinciding with the pre-release of their EP "Rise of the Wretched."

It was at this time that Junkyard Empire first came into local and national recognition with their performance at the "No Peace for the War Makers" on the steps of the Minnesota State Capitol during the third day of the RNC, when their show was interrupted by hundreds of riot cops attacking a group of bicyclists in the crowd. Tension raised to a fever pitch, nearly to a point of rioting, all while the band improvised over the tune Wretched (from the album Rise of the Wretched), as rapper Brihanu chanted to the police "let them go." Parts of this performance were featured in the documentary "Terrorizing Dissent".

In these early years, Junkyard Empire shared the stage with Desdamona, Michael "Eyedea" Larsen, Carnage The Executioner, Blue King Brown, Broadcast Live, Boots Riley and The Coup, Los Nativos, Kill the Vultures, Toki Wright, and numerous others.

For their third studio album, the band partnered with Marc Nicolas at a startup independent music label MediaRoots Music based in Santa Monica, CA. to produce Rebellion Politik (2009). Shortly after recording the material, the band and a Media Roots team embarked on a successful tour of Cuba, where they were invited by the Ministry of Culture in Havana.

The band's current lineup of MC Brihanu, Christopher Cox, Bryan Berry, Steve Hogan, and Graham O’Brien was finalized shortly before the release of their fourth album, "Acts of Humanity (2010), mixed by Brian Susko at Dharma Sound Studios (Santa Monica, CA) and mastered by Tom Garneau at Audio Active (Deephaven, Minnesota).

Homing in on the impact of performing live during the RNC protests, Junkyard Empire traveled to New York in spring of 2010 to perform at the first annual "Sounds of Resistance" protest and direct-action rally at Union Square Park in New York City. Here they performed during a march on and subsequent occupation of the nation's leading foreclosure firm, Bank of America, on Tax Day.

The following fall, Junkyard Empire was invited to perform in Washington D.C. in support of an occupation of Freedom Plaza, located on Pennsylvania Avenue. This performance was to mark the start of the October 2011 occupation of D.C. and served as a supporting coalition for the burgeoning Occupy Movement, in fact organized long before Occupy Wall Street was under way.

Recent events
Junkyard Empire had a track featured on the May 2012 release of "Occupy This Album", a benefit album for the Occupy Movement featuring 99 tracks for the 99%. Junkyard Empire's "Rebellion Politik" title track is featured alongside notable artists such as Tom Morello, of Rage Against the Machine, Anti-Flag, Willie Nelson, Jackson Browne, Ani DiFranco among others. Their well-known track "We Want" from their fourth album Acts of Humanity is now the theme song for Project Censored's radio show on Berkeley's KPFA radio.

Political affiliations
Junkyard Empire performed at No Peace for the War Makers during the 2008 Republican National Convention in St. Paul, which was featured in the movie Terrorizing Descent. The band has also worked closely with The League of Pissed Off Voters (aka League of Independent Voters) and Canvassed Neighborhoods in St. Paul during the 2008 election. In addition, the group also supports the Anti-War Committee, Food Not Bombs, the World Fair Trade Organization, the Committee to Stop FBI Repression, the Earth Liberation Front (ELF), the RNC 8, the Physicians for a National Health Program and many other revolution-minded groups.

References

American hip hop groups
American jazz ensembles from Minnesota
University of Minnesota alumni
Alternative rock groups from Minnesota